The Eye of the Storm is the ninth published novel by the Australian novelist and 1973 Nobel Prize-winner, Patrick White.  It tells the story of Elizabeth Hunter, the powerful matriarch of her family, who still maintains a destructive iron grip on those who come to say farewell to her in her final moments upon her deathbed.  

It is regarded as one of White's best novels, largely owing to the reputation it received from the Swedish Academy when they specifically named it as the book that confirmed White's designation as a Literature Laureate.

Film adaptation

A film adaptation directed by Fred Schepisi and starring Charlotte Rampling as Elizabeth Hunter and  Geoffrey Rush and Judy Davis as Elizabeth's children Basil and Dorothy was released in September 2011.

References

External links
 Excerpts from the novel at the ABC's "Why Bother With Patrick White?" archive.
 Synopsis and interpretation by Alan Lawson at the ABC's "Why Bother With Patrick White?" archive.

1973 Australian novels
Novels by Patrick White
Novels set in Sydney
Jonathan Cape books